HMCS Capilano was a  that served with the Royal Canadian Navy during the Second World War. She served primarily as a convoy escort in the Battle of the Atlantic. She is named for Capilino River in North Vancouver, British Columbia.

Capilano was ordered on 1 February 1943 as part of the 1943-44 River-class building program. She was laid down on 18 November 1943 by Yarrows Ltd. at Esquimalt and launched 8 April 1944. Capilano was commissioned into the RCN on 25 August 1944 at Victoria, British Columbia.

Background

The River-class frigate was designed by William Reed of Smith's Dock Company of South Bank-on-Tees. Originally called a "twin-screw corvette", its purpose was to improve on the convoy escort classes in service with the Royal Navy at the time, including the Flower-class corvette. The first orders were placed by the Royal Navy in 1940 and the vessels were named for rivers in the United Kingdom, giving name to the class. In Canada they were named for towns and cities though they kept the same designation. The name "frigate" was suggested by Vice-Admiral Percy Nelles of the Royal Canadian Navy and was adopted later that year.

Improvements over the corvette design included improved accommodation which was markedly better. For underwater targets, the River-class frigate was equipped with a Hedgehog anti-submarine mortar and depth charge rails aft and four side-mounted throwers.

River-class frigates were the first Royal Canadian Navy warships to carry the 147B Sword horizontal fan echo sonar transmitter in addition to the irregular ASDIC. This allowed the ship to maintain contact with targets even while firing unless a target was struck. Improved radar and direction-finding equipment improved the RCN's ability to find and track enemy submarines over the previous classes.

Canada originally ordered the construction of 33 frigates in October 1941. The design was too big for the shipyards on the Great Lakes so all the frigates built in Canada were built in dockyards along the west coast or along the St. Lawrence River. In all Canada ordered the construction of 60 frigates including ten for the Royal Navy that transferred two to the United States Navy.

Service history
After commissioning, Capilano transited to Halifax and worked up initially in St. Margaret's Bay before completing them at Bermuda. In November 1944 she was assigned to the Mid-Ocean Escort Force (MOEF) escort group C-2 as a trans-Atlantic convoy escort. She continued in this capacity until the end of the conflict in Europe at which point she returned to Canada in June 1945 and upon arrival, began her tropicalization refit for possible deployment to the Pacific Ocean. The refit was completed on 10 October, however by this point, Japan had surrendered and on 24 November 1945, she was paid off and placed in reserve at Bedford Basin.

Capilano was sold for mercantile use in 1947 and underwent conversion. In 1948 she reappeared as the Panamanian-registered Irving Francis M., owned by Irving Mindel. On 8 December 1953, while under tow from Jamaica to Miami, she foundered off the coast of Cabo Maysi, Cuba. In 2010, a framed photo of the ship and its badge was presented to the City of North Vancouver to mark the Canadian Naval Centennial.

See also
 List of ships of the Canadian Navy

References

Notes

Sources
Macpherson, Ken; Burgess, John. The ships of Canada's naval forces 1910-1981 : a complete pictorial history of Canadian warships. Collins: Toronto, 1981. 

River-class frigates of the Royal Canadian Navy
1944 ships